San Gregorio Formation may refer to:
 San Gregorio Formation, Mexico, Paleogene geologic formation of Mexico
 San Gregorio Formation, Uruguay, Permian geologic formation of Uruguay
 San Gregorio Formation, Venezuela, Pliocene geologic formation of Venezuela